action/2015 was a global coalition of more than 2200 organisations and networks from over 150 countries, united by the belief that 2015 was a critical year for progress in the fight against climate change, poverty and inequality.

Throughout the year, this coalition engaged and mobilised the public at critical decision-making points to call on leaders to commit to strong goals and agreements at two crucial UN summits in 2015 - the UN General Assembly  and the UN Climate Change Conference. Throughout the year, millions of activists came together through action/2015 to ensure world leaders would feel the pressure to seize the opportunity to tackle poverty, inequality and climate change.

With 31 million campaign actions taken in 157 countries, action/2015 was a massive global movement for change – the biggest-ever of its kind.

Key moments of the campaign

The action/2015 coalition came together during key moments through the year:

 action/2015 launch
 International Women's Day
 Earth Day
 May Mobilisations
 G7
 Financing For Development
 International Youth Day
 UN General Assembly
 UN Climate Change Conference

action/2015 launch

The campaign launched on 15 January 2015 in 60 countries around the world. 32 high-profile figures including Malala Yousafzai, Desmond Tutu, Shakira, Bill Gates, and Matt Damon joined the call to action, adding their name to an open letter addressed to world leaders.

Around the world, people took to the streets in rallies, marches, and stunts to demand their leaders take action – including Liberia, Mauritius, Belgium, El Salvador, Barbados, and many more.

International Women’s Day

On International Women's Day, 8 March 2015, campaigners around the world asked for ambitious action to transform the lives of women and girls around the world and highlighted that the upcoming UN summits on climate change and sustainable development goals could prove to be the single most important negotiations for women in history.

Campaigners around the world, in places such as Bangladesh and Egypt, gathered on March 8 to call on world leaders to deliver ambitious agreements that fulfil women's rights.

Earth Day

On 18 April, ahead of the meeting of Finance Ministers in Washington, D.C. for the annual spring meeting of the World Bank, action/2015 joined the Global Citizen 2015 Earth Day event where a quarter million global citizens gathered on the National Mall in Washington, DC, with over 2 million more people watching the event online.

May Mobilisations

In May, over 22 million people took to the streets in over 150 countries during 14 days of thematic action.

Some key highlights of the month-long activity included World Vision’s Global Week of Action which generated 20.4 million actions and featured more than 30,000 events in Bangladesh; Mali texting 5 million people in partnership with Orange; the Poverty is Sexist and # campaigns, which attracted support from celebrities like Malala Yousafzai, Beyonce and Shonda Rhimes; and HelpAge International’s All Ages Action Day supported by Desmond Tutu.

G7

On 7 and 8 June 2015, world leaders from the seven richest countries met in Germany to discuss the most pressing issues for our world. action/2015 joined the free ‘United Against Poverty’ concert in Munich’s iconic Königsplatz for an event featuring inspirational speakers, musicians, activists and celebrities including Usher, Afrojack, and Ellen Johnson Sirleaf to ask G7 leaders to step up and play their part in the fight against poverty, inequality, and climate change.

Financing For Development

In July 2015, action/2015 campaigners from 90 countries around the world called on their governments to tackle tax injustice, prioritise the poorest, and keep their promises on aid commitments and public spending to coincide with the Financing For Development meeting in Addis Adaba, Ethiopia.

International Youth Day

On 12 August 2015, action/2015 coordinated one of the largest global youth mobilisations in history for International Youth Day. Under the banner '#YouthPower: it's down to us', action/2015 youth campaigners in over 80 countries conducted over 100 mobilisation events in which over 115,000 people worldwide took to the streets, attended workshops, and met with government officials.

action/1D 
Ahead of the international summits, One Direction added their voice to the action/2015 campaign, calling on their fans to make their voices heard on issues such as poverty and inequality by submitting videos and photos to their website. More than 80,000 people from 172 countries responded to the call to action.

One Direction's involvement in the campaign generated significant interest, with over 2.5 billion Twitter impressions of the #action1D hashtag and support from Hillary Clinton.

UN General Assembly

On 24 September 2015, the evening before the Global Goals were adopted at the United Nations General Assembly, the action/2015 movement took to the streets in 105 countries around the world.

These events, which included iconic locations such as Millennium Bridge in London, Purana Qila in New Delhi, Largo da Batata square in São Paulo, and outside the United Nations building itself in New York City saw over 250,000 people take to the streets.

Through these actions, action/2015 showed that these goals have a real public constituency behind them. With diverse communities and sectors – from development, to climate, to human rights – joining hands, action/2015 also set the narrative around the Sustainable Development Goals, highlighting how the three core issues of our time – poverty, inequality and climate change – are interlinked. That addressing climate change, and ending poverty and inequalities are two sides of the same coin. We can't deliver sustainable development without tackling climate change, and we can't tackle climate change without addressing the root causes of poverty, inequality and unsustainable development patterns.

In his address to the UN Special summit on behalf of civil society, the head of Amnesty International referenced the action/2015 mobilisation, saying "Thousands of people marched last night for the Sustainable Development Goals to light the way. They called for authentic leadership from you, leadership with integrity, leadership from the heart. I know that you can live up to their hopes."

UN Climate Change Conference

On 28 and 29 November 2015, as governments of over 190 countries prepared to deliver a historic new global climate agreement at COP21 in Paris, the action/2015 movement joined with thousands around the world for the Global Climate March. 785,000 people marched at over 2,300 events in 175 countries, making it the biggest climate mobilisation in history.

This included over 60,000 people in Melbourne, 100,000 in India, over 50,000 in London, 2,500 in Chile, and over 20,000 in Malawi.

In Uganda, action/2015 was a key organiser of the Climate March in Kampala, echoing the call for climate action from Pope Francis, who was in the country as part of his first trip to Africa.

References

External links 
 action/2015
 action/2015 Twitter
 action/2015 Facebook
 action/2015 YouTube
 action/2015 Evaluation and Lessons Learned

Economic development organizations
Poverty-related organizations